Brigitte Grothum (born 26 February 1935) is a German film actress. She has appeared in 50 films since 1955. She was born in Dessau, Germany.

Selected filmography

Ripening Youth (1955), as Dora
The First Day of Spring (1956), as Trixi
Das Mädchen Marion (1956), as Marion von Hoff
The Last Ones Shall Be First (1957), as Irene Darrandt
Lemke's Widow (1957), as Lore
 Two Times Adam, One Time Eve (1959), as Silja
The Miracle of Father Malachia (1961), as Gussy
The Strange Countess (1961), as Margaret Reedle
Her Most Beautiful Day (1962), as Inge
Der rote Rausch (1962), as Katrin
 The Happy Years of the Thorwalds (1962) as Helga Thorwald
The Inn on the River (1962), as Leila Smith
The Curse of the Yellow Snake (1963), as Joan Bray
 (1968, TV miniseries), as Jane Conway
Einer spinnt immer (1971), as Liane
Grete Minde (1977), as Emerentz Zernitz
Drei Damen vom Grill (1977–1992, TV series, 140 episodes), as Magda Färber
Liebling Kreuzberg (1986, TV series), as Erika, Robert Liebling's ex-wife
The Dancing Girl (舞姫) (1989), as Anna Weigelt
The Last Train (2006), as Gabrielle Hellman
 (2011), as Hanna Reich
 (2014, TV film), as Nicky's Mother

References

External links

1935 births
Living people
German film actresses
German television actresses
People from Dessau-Roßlau
20th-century German actresses
German voice actresses